The Brokaw-McDougall House is a historic mansion in Tallahassee, Florida. Built in 1856, it is located at 329 North Meridian Road. On July 24, 1972, it was added to the U.S. National Register of Historic Places.

The house was begun in 1856 and completed in 1860 by Peres Bonney Brokaw who had moved to Florida from New Jersey in 1850. His daughter eventually inherited the house; the reference to McDougall in the house's name comes from that daughter's married name. The house was sold to Florida in 1973 and is used as the offices of the Historic Tallahassee Preservation Board.

References

External links

 Leon County listings at National Register of Historic Places
 Florida's Office of Cultural and Historical Programs
 Leon County listings
 Brokaw-McDougall House

History of Tallahassee, Florida
Historic buildings and structures in Leon County, Florida
Houses on the National Register of Historic Places in Florida
National Register of Historic Places in Tallahassee, Florida
Houses in Tallahassee, Florida
Greek Revival houses in Florida
Houses completed in 1860
1860 establishments in Florida